Cresa is an international commercial real estate firm headquartered in Chicago, IL. Cresa is notable for its occupier-only real estate representation services including Transaction Management (lease & sale), Building Technology Solutions, Consulting, Facilities Management, Global Portfolio Solutions, Investment Banking, Lease Administration, Location Strategy & Economic Incentives, Mission Critical Solutions, Project Management, Remote Advisory Services, Supply Chain & Distribution, Technology Advisory Services, Workplace Intelligence, and Workspace Planning, Design & Support.

History
Cresa was founded in 1993 when Avalon Partners, headed by Bill Goade, formed an alliance with four other commercial real estate firms: Prevé Liberatore & Barton in Miami, Cooper/Brady in San Jose and Palo Alto, Tanguay Burke Stratton in Chicago, and Metrospace of Los Angeles. The firms averaged 20-year histories in their respective markets before joining as the CresaPartners Alliance.

After years in the industry, Cresa's founders recognized that the existing commercial real estate model was broken and inherently unfair to occupiers. They set out to level the playing field, acting as unbiased advisors exclusively for corporate space users.

By 1995, Cresa had grown to 30 cities. In 1998, the organization changed its structure from an alliance to that of an LLC, similar to large consulting firms, and took on the CresaPartners LLC name, expanding further to 48 offices. In 2008, with 50 North American offices, Cresa became one of the largest occupier-focused commercial real estate firms in the world.

In 2017, Cresa merged the ownership of 20 individual offices to become a single entity: Cresa Global, Inc. This structure enabled the firm to invest in their business and add services designed to provide value to clients. The offices that did not merge continue to operate under license agreements, as they did before the merger.

Cresa is – and always has been – 100% employee owned. Structured like a professional services consulting firm, Cresa's equity is held by professionals in each office. The firm is managed by a corporate staff and a board of directors who set the strategic vision for the firm. Cresa continues to be the largest occupier-focused firm in the world, with over 80 offices globally.

Overview 
Cresa includes more than 80 offices and over 1,000 employees.  The firm is a privately held, with more than one-quarter of employees serving as partners.

Cresa has received multiple awards and  has been included on top achievement lists, including Site Selection's Service Provider of the Year, American Business Journals’ Best Places to Work, INC. 5000, and Realcomm's “Top Ten Most Innovative Brokerage Firms.” Several Cresa offices have been consistently honored with Best Places to Work recognition.

In 2010, Cresa was certified as a "Sustainable Business Leader", having completed the Sustainable Business Leader Program (SBLP) -- a program of the Sustainable Business Network (SBN) that provides guidance, support and technical assistance to facilitate the "greening" of small and medium-sized businesses.

United Space Alliance awarded Cresa its 2010 Small Business of the Year award for the firm's work in developing USA's “workplace of the future” office standards.

Notable personnel

Tod Lickerman was appointed CEO in 2021; Mr. Lickerman joined Cresa's Board in 2019 and has extensive commercial real estate experience spanning over 35 years. Mr. Lickerman previously served as Global President and Americas CEO at Cushman & Wakefield. Prior, he served as Global CEO of DTZ, where he led the firm in taking the company private and acquiring Cassidy Turley and Cushman & Wakefield. In total, he helped acquire and integrate 20 companies into the global platform company that Cushman & Wakefield is today with revenues in excess of $7 billion. Earlier in his career, Mr. Lickerman served as CEO of Corporate Solutions Americas at JLL and ran several divisions including healthcare, energy, and European facility management.

References

Real estate services companies of the United States
Real estate companies established in 1993
Companies based in Washington, D.C.
Commercial real estate companies